Mesosa ornata is a species of beetle in the family Cerambycidae. It was described by Charles Joseph Gahan in 1895. It is known from Myanmar.

References

ornata
Beetles described in 1895